The Qingdao International Sailing Centre is a sailing marina located on the former site of the Beihai Shipyard by Qingdao's Fushan Bay at Shandong Province in China. It was constructed for the 2008 Summer Olympics. It hosted the Olympic and Paralympic Sailing competitions. Wind conditions vary greatly from very light winds to +15 knots. During the Olympic competitions, fog was also an occasional factor.

The venue hosted “Good Luck Beijing - 2006" and in May 2008, the IFDS Qingdao International Regatta, where Olympic and Paralympic sailors got a headstart on familiarizing themselves with the venue and weather conditions.

Access from the Qingdao Paralympic Village to the dock, work areas, etc. was provided by numerous golf carts making endless daytime rounds. Both ends of the work area had two cranes apiece, which could lift large keelboats like the Sonar from cradles and lower these into the water. At night, a laser light show from the main breakwater lighthouse would play from early evening to midnight. Facing the Yellow Sea, the main breakwater with spectator seating, windmills, flags and lighthouse was also the viewing area for the sailing competitions when not on the spectator ferry. Across the bay, the famous May 4 monument and Qingdao's landmark seaside building are easily visible.

The Qingdao Olympic Sailing Center covers 45 hectares, comprising a 30 hectare competition area and 15 hectare area for development after the Games. The seven facilities, include the Qingdao Sub-Village, Athletes Center, Administrative Center, Venue Media Center, Logistics Center, Reception Center and Accreditation Center.

Ground was broken on May 25, 2004 and was completed in 2008.

Paralympic Medalists
In the 2-person keelboat event, all three of the medal-winning SKUD 18 teams were composed of one man and one woman. Maureen McKinnon-Tucker (United States), Rachael Cox (AUS) and Stacie Louttit (CAN) became the first three women to win Paralympic medals in sailing.

References

Beijing2008.cn profile
Sept 2008 Paralympic Sailing Competition, Qingdao

Venues of the 2008 Summer Olympics
Buildings and structures in Qingdao
Olympic sailing venues
Sailing centers
Sport in Qingdao
Sports venues in Shandong
Tourist attractions in Qingdao